The 2004 RCA Championships was a men's tennis tournament played on outdoor hard courts. It was the 17th edition of the event known that year as the RCA Championships, and was part of the International Series of the 2004 ATP Tour. It took place at the Indianapolis Tennis Center in Indianapolis, Indiana, United States, from July 19 through July 26, 2004. It was the second event of the 2004 US Open series, after the Mercedes Benz Cup in Los Angeles. Andy Roddick won the singles title.

Finals

Singles

 Andy Roddick defeated  Nicolas Kiefer, 6–2, 6–3
It was Andy Roddick's 4th title of the year, and his 15th overall.

Doubles

 Jordan Kerr /  Jim Thomas defeated  Wayne Black /  Kevin Ullyett 6–7(7–9), 7–6(7–3), 6–3

External links
Singles draw
Doubles draw